Royal Albert Hall London May 2-3-5-6, 2005 is a live album by the British rock band Cream, recorded at the Royal Albert Hall in 2005 during the band's reunion tour. As the title implies, the recording includes songs from their four reunion shows on 2, 3, 5, and 6 May 2005.

Within five months of these performances, this collection of recordings was released as separate double Compact Disc and double DVD sets. Two months later in December, a triple LP set was also released, containing tracks identical to the CD set. A Blu-ray version also exists.

The album reached No. 59 on the Billboard 200 album chart on 22 October 2005.

Reception

Critical 
In his review for Allmusic, Stephen Thomas Erlewine said that the shows at the Royal Albert Hall did not live up to Cream's concerts in the past, including their 1993 induction performance for the Rock and Roll Hall of Fame, not necessarily all because of their age, but primarily having not played together for quite some time. J. D. Considine spoke much more highly of the shows because Cream were not as fixated with psychedelic jam sessions and sounded better than before.

Compact Disc track listing 
Disc one
"I'm So Glad" (Skip James)  – 6:18
"Spoonful" (Willie Dixon)  – 7:29
"Outside Woman Blues" (Blind Joe Reynolds, arr. Clapton)  – 4:33
"Pressed Rat and Warthog" (Ginger Baker, Mike Taylor)  – 3:21
"Sleepy Time Time"  (Jack Bruce, Janet Godfrey)  – 6:08
"N.S.U." (Bruce)  – 6:02
"Badge"  (Eric Clapton, George Harrison)  – 3:59
"Politician" (Bruce, Pete Brown)  – 5:08
"Sweet Wine" (Baker, Godfrey)  – 6:28
"Rollin' and Tumblin'" (Hambone Willie Newbern)  – 5:02
"Stormy Monday"  (T-Bone Walker)  – 8:09
"Deserted Cities of the Heart" (Bruce, Brown)  – 3:56

Disc two
"Born Under a Bad Sign" (William Bell, Booker T. Jones)  – 5:31
"We're Going Wrong" (Bruce)  – 8:26
"Crossroads" (Robert Johnson, arr. Clapton)  – 4:25
"White Room"  (Bruce, Brown)  – 5:39
"Toad" (drum solo)  (Baker)  – 10:07
"Sunshine of Your Love"  (Bruce, Clapton, Brown)  – 8:46
"Sleepy Time Time"  (Alternate) (Bruce, Godfrey)  – 6:07

DVD track listing 
Disc one
"I'm So Glad" (James)
"Spoonful" (Dixon)
"Outside Woman Blues" (Reynolds; arr. Clapton)
"Pressed Rat and Warthog" (Baker, Taylor)
"Sleepy Time Time"  (Bruce, Godfrey)
"N.S.U." (Bruce)
"Badge"  (Clapton, Harrison)
"Politician" (Bruce, Brown)
"Sweet Wine" (Baker, Godfrey)
"Rollin' and Tumblin'" (Newbern)
"Stormy Monday"  (Walker)
"Deserted Cities of the Heart"  (Bruce, Brown)
"Born Under a Bad Sign" (Bell, Jones)
"We're Going Wrong" (Bruce)
"Sleepy Time Time" (Alternate Take) (Bruce, Godfrey) (Extra feature)
"We're Going Wrong" (Alternate Take)  (Bruce) (Extra feature)

Disc two
"Crossroads" (Johnson; arr. Clapton)
"Sitting on Top of the World" (Walter Vinson, Lonnie Chatmon; arr. Chester Burnett)
"White Room"  (Bruce, Brown)
"Toad"  (Baker)
"Sunshine of Your Love"  (Bruce, Clapton, Brown)
"Sunshine of Your Love" (Alternate Take) (Bruce, Clapton, Brown) (Extra feature)
Interviews with Baker, Bruce and Clapton (Extra feature)

Notes 
Although the title mentions all four dates Cream played in May 2005, these releases contain no performances recorded 2 May. However, there is a brief clip shown on the DVD of Clapton speaking to the crowd recorded on the first night.
 These tracks recorded 3 May.
 These tracks recorded 5 May.
All other tracks recorded 6 May.

The recording of "Sitting on Top of the World", the alternate takes of "We're Going Wrong" and "Sunshine of Your Love" and the interviews are exclusive to the DVD set. All other tracks are identical to the CD release.

Credits 
Cream
Jack Bruce – vocals, bass guitar, harmonica
Eric Clapton – guitar, vocals
Ginger Baker – drums, cowbells, vocals

Production
Simon Climie – audio production
Mick Guzauski – audio mixer
Alan Douglas – Recording Engineer

Charts

Weekly charts

Certifications

Album

Video

References

External links 
Official site – Cream2005.com (broken link)

Cream (band) live albums
Live albums recorded at the Royal Albert Hall
2005 live albums
Reprise Records live albums